Dunston is a small village in the North Kesteven district of Lincolnshire, England.

In Domesday the village is written as "Dunestune", meaning 'Dune's farm'.

The parish church is dedicated to St Peter, and is a Grade II listed building dating from the 12th century. It was restored by R. H. Carpenter between 1874 and 1876.

It is a Grade II listed tower and former land lighthouse built by Sir Francis Dashwood to guide travellers across Lincoln Heath. In 1810, at the jubilee of George III, the lantern was removed and replaced with a statue of the king, and in the 1843 Journal of the Agricultural Society it was described as the "only land light-house ever raised".

The White Horse public house is to the east at Dunston Fen; the Red Lion is on Middle Street.

Twinned village
 Trangé, near Le Mans, France.

References

External links
 "Dunstan, Lincolnshire: a Lincolnshire village"; Macla.co.uk. Retrieved 24 April 2012

Villages in Lincolnshire
Civil parishes in Lincolnshire
North Kesteven District